Aşağı Bucaq (also, Ashagy-Budzhak and Ashagy-Budzhal) is a village and municipality in the Yevlakh Rayon of Azerbaijan. It has a population of 2,391. The municipality consists of the villages of Aşağı Bucaq, Yuxarı Bucaq, and Yenicə.

References 

Populated places in Yevlakh District